This is a list of Sri Lankan non-career diplomats, who have been appointed by Government of Sri Lanka as Ambassadors and High Commissioners, but are not Career diplomats by profession, meaning they are not from the Sri Lanka Foreign Service, but are from different professions and politicians.

Academics
 J B Disanayake - Ambassador to Thailand
 Ananda W.P. Guruge - Ambassador to France, Ambassador Extraordinary and Plenipotentiary to UNESCO and USA
 Lal Jayawardane - High Commissioner to United Kingdom
 W. S. Karunaratne - Ambassador to US
 Karunasena Kodituwakku - Ambassador to Japan, Republic of South Korea and China (note: also listed under "Parliamentarians" and "Provincial Governors")
 G.P Malalasekera, OBE - Ambassador to Soviet Union, High Commissioner to United Kingdom, Canada and Ambassador / Permanent Representative to United Nations in New York
 Ediriweera Sarachchandra - Ambassador to France
 Gamini Gunawardane - High Commissioner to South Africa

Architects
 Oliver Weerasinghe, FRIBA - Ambassador to USA

Business
 A. S. P Liyanage - Ambassador to Qatar, former High Commissioner to Nigeria
 Udayanga Weeratunga - Ambassador to Russian Federation
 Jaliya Wickramasuriya - Ambassador to USA

Corporate executives
 Somasunadaran Skandakumar - High Commissioner to Australia

Civil servants
 Sirisena Amarasekara - High Commissioner to South Africa
 Richard Aluwihare, CBE, JP - High Commissioner to India
 Shirley Amerasinghe - High Commissioner to India, Ambassador to Nepal and Afghanistan and Permanent Representative to United Nations (New York)
 Velupillai Coomaraswamy - High Commissioner to Canada
 Gunasena de Soyza, CMG, OBE - High Commissioner to United Kingdom
 N. Q. Dias - High Commissioner to India
 K. C. Logeswaran - Ambassador to Republic of Korea
 S. J. Walpita - Ambassador to the Federal Republic of Germany, the Netherlands and Belgium
 Neville Jayaweera - Ambassador to Sweden, Norway, Denmark and Finland

Economists
 Gamani Corea - Ambassador to the EEC, Belgium, Luxembourg and the Netherlands
 Lal Jayawardena - High Commissioner to the United Kingdom and Ambassador to the Benelux countries

Filmmakers
  Sumitra Peries - Ambassador to France

Journalists
 Ernest Corea - Ambassador to USA; High Commissioner to Canada
 Dayan Jayatilleka - Permanent Representative to United Nations (Geneva); Consul General for Switzerland; Ambassador to France and UNESCO 
 Premil Ratnayake - First Secretary, for Press and Information to Bonn, Germany in 1984.

Judges
 Hon. Justice H. W. Thambiah - High Commissioner to Canada

Lawyers
 Kusumsiri Balapatabendi - High Commissioner to Australia
 John De Saram - Ambassador / Permanent Representative to United Nations (New York)
 H.L. de Silva, PC - Ambassador / Permanent Representative to United Nations (New York)
 Neville Kanakeratne - Ambassador to USA and High Commissioner to India
 Daya Perera PC - Ambassador / Permanent Representative to United Nations (New York) and High Commissioner to Canada
 Sir Lalitha Rajapakse, KC - Ambassador to France and High Commissioner to the U.K. 
 Faisz Musthapha, - High Commissioner to the U.K.
 Wickrema Weerasuriya - High Commissioner to Australia and New Zealand
 Tissa Wijeyeratne - Ambassador to France, Switzerland and UNESCO
 Jayathri Samarakone - High Commissioner to Singapore

Physicians 
 M. V. P. Peiris - Ambassador to Soviet Union and High Commissioner to United Kingdom    (note: also listed in "Senators")

Military officers

Army 
 General (Rtrd.) Rohan Daluwatte, RWP, RSP, VSV, USP - Ambassador to Brazil
 General (Rtrd.) Deshamanya D. S. Attygalle, MVO - High Commissioner to United Kingdom
 General (Rtrd.) G. H. De Silva, RWP, RSP, VSV, USP - High Commissioner to Pakistan
 General (Rtrd.) Deshamanya Denis Perera, VSV - High Commissioner to Australia
 General (Rtrd.) Shantha Kottegoda, WWV, RWP, RSP, VSV, USP - Ambassador to Brazil and Thailand
 Major General (Rtrd.) Nanda Mallawaarachchi, RWP, VSV, USP - Ambassador to Indonesia
 Major General (Rtrd.) Anton Muttukumaru, OBE, ED, ADC - High Commissioner to Australia, New Zealand, Pakistan and Ambassador to Egypt
 Major General (Rtrd.) Janaka Perera, RWP, RSP, VSV, USP - High Commissioner to Australia & Ambassador to Indonesia
 General (Rtrd.) Cyril Ranatunga, VSV - High Commissioner to Australia and United Kingdom
 Major General (Rtrd.) Richard Udugama, MBE - Ambassador to Iraq
 General (Rtrd.) Cecil Waidyaratne, VSV, USP, SLAC - Ambassador to Thailand
 General (Rtrd.) Srilal Weerasooriya, RWP, RSP, VSV, USP - High Commissioner to Pakistan
 General (Rtrd.) T. I. Weerathunga, VSV - High Commissioner to Canada
 General (Rtrd.) Jagath Jayasuriya, RWP, VSV, USP - Ambassador to Brazil

Navy 
 Vice Admiral (Rtrd.) A.H.A De Silva, VSV - Ambassador to Cuba
 Admiral (Rtrd.) Wasantha Karannagoda - Ambassador to Japan   
 Admiral (Rtrd.) Thisara Samarasinghe - High Commissioner to Australia

Air Force 
 Air Chief Marshal Gagan Bulathsinghala - Ambassador to Islamic Republic of Afghanistan
 Air Chief Marshal Kapila Jayampathy - High Commissioner to Malaysia
 Air Chief Marshal (Rtrd.) Jayalath Weerakkody - High Commissioner to Pakistan
 Air Chief Marshal (Rtrd.) Donald Perera - Ambassador to Israel

Police officers
 Rudra Rajasingham (IGP) - Ambassador to Indonesia
 Ana Seneviratne (IGP) - High Commissioner to Malaysia
 Herbert Weerasinghe (IGP) - High Commissioner to Malaysia

Politicians
Governors general
 Sir Oliver Goonetilleke, GCMG, KCVO, KBE, KStJ - High Commissioner to United Kingdom
 William Gopallawa, MBE - Ambassador to China, Cuba, Mexico and USA

Senators
 Razik Fareed, Kt, OBE, JP, UM - High Commissioner to Pakistan
 Stanley Kalpage - High Commissioner to India and Ambassador / Permanent Representative to United Nations in New York
 Reggie Perera - Ambassador to Egypt
 Lalitha Rajapakse - Ambassador to France and High Commissioner to United Kingdom   (note: also listed in "Lawyers")
 A. F. Wijemanne - Ambassador to Italy and Permanent Representative to FAO 
 Edwin Wijeyeratne - High Commissioner to United Kingdom and India

State and legislative councilors
 Claude Corea - Ambassador to USA and High Commissioner to United Kingdom
 Susantha de Fonseka, KBE - Ambassador to Burma and Japan
 T.B Jayah - High Commissioner to Pakistan
 D.B Jayatilaka - High Commissioner to India
 C. W. W. Kannangara - Ambassador to Indonesia
 Tikiri Bandara Panabokke - Representative of the Government of Ceylon to India

Provincial Governors
 Noel Wimalasena - High Commissioner to United Kingdom (note: also listed in "Parliamentarians")
 E. L. B. Hurulle - High Commissioner to Australia (note: also listed in "Parliamentarians")
 Karunasena Kodituwakku - Ambassador to Japan, Republic of South Korea and China (note: also listed in "Academics" and "Parliamentarians")
 Ariya Rekawa - Ambassador to Philippines (note: also listed in "Parliamentarians")
 Dixon Dela Bandara - High Commissioner to Maldives

Parliamentarians
 Ferial Ashraff - High Commissioner to Singapore 
 Robert Gunawardena - Ambassador to China
 Noel Wimalasena - High Commissioner to United Kingdom
 Dharmasena Attygalle - High Commissioner to Pakistan
 Fred E. de Silva - Ambassador to France, Switzerland and UNESCO
 P.H. William de Silva - High Commissioner to Canada 
 A.E. Goonesinha - Ambassador to Indonesia and Burma (Myanmar)
 Tudor Gunasekara - Ambassador to Poland, Bulgaria, Rumania and Hungary
 R.S.S. Gunewardene - High Commissioner to United Kingdom, Ambassador to Italy, USA and Ambassador / Permanent Representative to United Nations (New York) 
 E. L. B. Hurulle - High Commissioner to Australia (note: also listed in "Parliamentarians" and "Provincial Governors")
 Sirisena Cooray - High Commissioner to Malaysia
 Karu Jayasuriya - Ambassador to Germany
 P.B.G. Kalugalla - High Commissioner to Canada and Ambassador to Philippines
 Rupa Karunathilake - Ambassador to Netherlands
 Karunasena Kodituwakku - Ambassador to Japan, Republic of South Korea and China (note: also listed in "Academics" and "Provincial Governors")
 Anil Moonesinghe - Ambassador to Austria, Bosnia-Herzegovina, Croatia, the Czech Republic, Hungary, Slovakia, Slovenia, Yugoslavia, the UN (Vienna), IAEA and OPEC
 Mangala Moonesinghe - High Commissioner to United Kingdom and India
 Susil Moonesinghe - Ambassador to Iran
 Theodore Braybrooke Panabokke - High Commissioner to India
 R. S. Pelpola - High Commissioner to Malaysia
 Wilmot A. Perera  - Ambassador to China 
 H. R. Piyasiri - Ambassador to Myanmar 
 C. Rajadurai - High Commissioner to Malaysia 
 T.B. Subasinghe - Ambassador to Soviet Union
 Rosy Senanayake - High Commissioner to Malaysia
 Nissanka Wijeyeratne, CCS - Ambassador to Soviet Union
 Ariya Rekawa - Ambassador to Philippines

Mayors
 Omar Kamil - Ambassador to Iran, accredited to Azerbaijan and Turkmenistan
 A. J. M. Muzammil - High Commissioner to Malaysia

UN officials
 T. D. S. A. Dissanayake - Sri Lankan Ambassador to Indonesia and Egypt 
 Palitha Kohona - Ambassador / Permanent Representative to United Nations (New York)

References

External links
 Sri Lanka ambassadors (non-career) - flickr
 Kachcheri postings for senior career diplomats returning from overseas

Lists of Sri Lankan people by occupation

Sri Lankan diplomats
non-c